The 2012 Dunlop Dubai 24 Hour was the 7th running of the Dubai 24 Hour endurance race. It took place at the Dubai Autodrome between January 13–14, 2012.

Race result
Class Winners in bold.

References

External links
 

Dubai 24 Hour
Dubai 24 Hour
Dubai 24 Hour